Tales of Ancient Prophecies is the debut studio album by Swedish power metal band Twilight Force, released on June 4, 2014 in Scandinavia and June 6 to worldwide audiences. It is the band's only album on Black Lodge Records; for their next studio album, Heroes of Mighty Magic, the band signed to Nuclear Blast Records. To support the album, the band embarked on a month-long European tour alongside Gloryhammer known as The Unicorn Invasion of Europe 2014. Although the album failed to chart internationally, it was a minor commercial success in the band's home country of Sweden, peaking at number 29 for 2 weeks.

Track listing

Personnel 
Twilight Force
 Daniele – keyboards, piano, violin, cembalo, narration, backing vocals
 Borne – bass guitar
 Felipe – lead guitar, acoustic guitar, lute, backing vocals
 Christian Hedgren – lead vocals
 Roberto – drums, percussion

Additional musicians
 Joakim Brodén – vocals (1, 2, 11)
 Kenny Leckremo – vocals (6)
 Andreas Olander – rhythm guitar, backing vocals
 Hanna Berglund – backing vocals
 Barbro Beckman – backing vocals
 Twilight Choir – backing vocals

Production
 Daniele – mastering, mixing, arranging, sound design, producer
 Felipe – producer, mixing
 Christian Hedgren – additional vocal arrangements (9)
 Martin Hanford – cover art

Charts

Notes
During the recording of the album, some musicians were known under different nicknames. After the album's release, several members changed their pseudonyms.

References

2014 albums
Twilight Force albums